Artines is a genus of skippers in the family Hesperiidae.

Species
Recognised species in the genus Artines include:
 Artines aepitus (Geyer, 1832)  
 Artines aquilina (Plötz, 1883)  
 Artines rica Steinhauser & Austin, 1993

Former species
Artines melitaea Draudt, 1923 - transferred to Lucida melitaea (Draudt, 1923)

References

Natural History Museum Lepidoptera genus database

Hesperiinae
Hesperiidae genera